Groupe Barrière operates casinos in France, Switzerland and elsewhere in Europe. The group also operates in the French luxury hotel industry and in the catering and leisure industries.

History

François André, founder
1912-1951: re-inventing the Deauville and La Baule seaside resorts

As a young man from Ardèche who came up to Paris in the early 20th century, François André started a casino business by acquiring the Ostend casino in Belgium, while Eugène Cornuché, his partner, began building the Hôtel Normandy and having the Deauville casino rebuilt in 1912. In 1918, François André set up the Haussmann gaming circle in Paris and continued to grow his business by designing the La Baule resort based on the Deauville model and by purchasing the Hôtel Royal and casino in 1923. He invented the modern day resort concept by combining casinos, luxury hotels and sports facilities all on one site.

In 1926, François André took on the construction of the Hôtel Hermitage at La Baule.

1927, he took over from Eugène Cornuché as managing director of SHCD (Société des Hôtels et Casino de Deauville). He then had the Hôtel du Golf in Deauville built.

Lucien Barrière
1951-1987 – Groupe Lucien Barrière's founding and development throughout France

In 1951, Lucien Barrière, François André's nephew, joined the group.

In 1957 Lucien Barrière was appointed to the Board of several of the group's entities and became his uncle's sole legal heir in 1961. He undertook a project to modernise and develop the group by buying new establishments in Trouville, Dinard, St-Malo, Royan and Enghien-les-Bains.

In 1980, SHCLB (Société Hôtelière de la Chaîne Lucien Barrière) was founded to cover the La Baule hotels and casinos.

In 1987, Lucien Barrière participated in the arrival of slot machines in France.

Diane Barrière-Desseigne
1990-2000:

In the early 1990s, Accor became a major SHCLB shareholder.

In 1990, Diane Barrière-Desseigne succeeded her father, Lucien Barrière, and launched major renovation projects. On top of their prestige, the hotels are closely connected to the film industry and the Arts. The elite figures of the film industry visit the Normandy Barrière and the Royal Barrière during the American Film Festival in Deauville.

In 1995, Diane Barrière-Desseigne suffered a very serious plane accident and from 1997, her husband Dominique Desseigne co-managed the SHCD and SHCLB at her side.

In 1998, SHCD bought Fouquet's restaurant and brand.

Diane Barrière-Desseigne died in 2001. Dominique Desseigne took over group management and became chairman of SFCMC.

Dominique Desseigne
Since 2001: Under the chairmanship of Dominique Desseigne, the SHCD and the SHCLB took on a new dimension with the first international developments.

In 2003, SHCLB opened the Casino Barrière de Montreux in Switzerland, which became the leading casino in Switzerland in 2008 in terms of total gross gaming takings.

During the same year, SHCD took over the Ryads Resort Development, owner of the land on which the Hôtel Naoura Barrière in Marrakech (Morocco) was later built, supported by top ranking investors who purchased an equity stake in Ryads Resort Development.

In 2004, the Desseigne-Barrière family, Accor and Colony Capital investment funds decided to team up as Société Hôtelière de la Chaîne Lucien Barrière, subsequently renamed Groupe Lucien Barrière, which combined the businesses of SHCD, SHCLB and Accor Casinos to create a prestigious casino and hotel group.

Since 2005, the expansion has continued with the opening of casinos in Toulouse, Cairo, Leucate, Blotzheim and Lille, the opening of the Naoura Barrière in Marrakech (Morocco), Hôtel Fouquet's Barrière in Paris and the Spark (fitness centre for treatments, sport and Spa) in Enghien-les-Bains. The Hôtel Barrière Lille will open during autumn 2010 and the hotel complex and balneo-therapy centre adjoining the Casino Barrière de Ribeauvillé is forecast to open late 2011.

During the same period, the public service concessions of the Barrière Casinos in La Baule, Dinard, Deauville, Saint-Malo, Nice, Cassis and Saint Raphaël were renewed, which reveals the confidence these towns place in the group.

On 15 April 2009, Colony Capital sold its Groupe Lucien Barrière shares to Accor, which now holds a 49% equity stake in the company.

In 2010, Groupe Lucien Barrière and Française des Jeux designed an on-line gaming platform with 3D online gaming, which is called LB Poker company.

Groupe Barrière establishments

Hotels

Barrière includes 18 hotels (16 in Metropolitan France, 1 in St Barth and 1 in Marrakech), with a majority of hotels ranked as five star.

Paris

Hotel Barrière Le Fouquet's Paris*****

Deauville

Hotel Barrière Le Normandy *****

Hotel Barrière Le Royal Deauville*****

Hôtel du Golf ****

Cannes

Hotel Barrière Le Majestic Cannes *****
Le Gray D'Albion Barrière *****

Courchevel

Hotel Barrière Les Neiges Courchevel *****

Dinard

Grand Hôtel Dinard*****

Enghien-les-Bains

Grand Hôtel Enghien ****

Hôtel du Lac****

Le Touquet

Le Westminster ****

La Baule

Castel Marie-Louise *****

Le Royal La Baule *****

L' Hermitage *****

Marrakech

Hôtel & Ryads Le Naoura *****

Lille

Resort Barrière Lille *****

Ribeauvillé

Resort Barrière Ribeauvillé ****

Saint Barthélemy

Hôtel Barrière Le Carl Gustaf ***** (end of 2017)

Casinos
The 37 casinos are located in resorts along the French coast and in major cities.

France
La Baule, 
Bénodet, 
Besançon, 
Biarritz, 
Blotzheim, 
Bordeaux, 
Briançon, 
Carnac, 
Carry-le-Rouet, 
Cassis, 
Chamonix, 
Dax, 
Deauville, 
Dinard, 
Enghien-les-Bains, 
Jonzac, 
Leucate, 
Lille, 
Menton, 
Nice Le Ruhl, 
Nierderbronn, 
Ouistreham, 
Perros-Guirec, 
Royan, 
Ribeauvillé, 
La Rochelle, 
Les Sables d'Olonne, 
Saint-Malo, 
Sainte-Maxime, 
Saint-Raphaël, 
Toulouse, 
Le Touquet and 
Trouville.

Switzerland
Courrendlin, Fribourg and Montreux Casino.

Egypt
Cairo.

Restaurants and bars
Groupe Lucien Barrière has 131 bars and restaurants throughout the group's casinos and hotels, which range from snacks to 5-star cuisine, as well as Fouquet's brasseries in Paris, Toulouse and Marrakech.

Sport and well-being
Spark, soins, sport et spa – Enghien-les-Bains
Le Spa Diane Barrière de l'Hôtel Barrière Le Fouquet's – Paris
Le Spa Diane Barrière du Naoura Barrière – Marrakech
Centre de thalassothérapie Thalgo – La Baule

Golf courses
Golf Barrière – Deauville
Golf Barrière de Saint-Julien – Deauville
Golf International Barrière – La Baule

Tennis clubs
Tennis club de l’Hôtel du Golf – Deauville
Tennis Country Club Barrière – La Baule

References

Gambling in France
French business families
Gambling companies of France
Hospitality companies of France
Hotel chains in France
Gambling websites
Gaming websites